The National (Metsovian) Technical University of Athens (NTUA; , National Metsovian Polytechnic), sometimes known as Athens Polytechnic, is among the oldest higher education institutions of Greece and the most prestigious among engineering schools. It is named  in honor of its benefactors Nikolaos Stournaris, Eleni Tositsa, Michail Tositsas and Georgios Averoff, whose origin is from the town of Metsovo in Epirus.

It was founded in 1837 as a part-time vocational school named Royal School of Arts which, as its role in the technical development of the fledgling state grew, developed into Greece's sole institution providing engineering degrees up until the 1950s, when polytechnics were established outside Athens. Its traditional campus, located in the center of Athens on Patission Avenue on a site donated by Eleni Tositsa, features a suite of magnificent neo-classical buildings by architect Lysandros Kaftantzoglou (1811–1885). A new campus, the Zografou Campus, was built in the 1980s.

NTUA is divided into nine academic schools, eight being for the engineering disciplines, including architecture, and one for applied sciences (mathematics and physics). Undergraduate studies have a duration of five years. 

Admission to NTUA is highly selective and can only be accomplished through achieving exceptional grades in the annual Panhellenic Exams. It is a widely spread perception that the vast majority of each year's Panhellenic Exams top students interested in the sciences and technology opts to attend NTUA

The university comprises about 700 of academic staff, 140 scientific assistants and 260 administrative and technical staff. It also has about 8,500 undergraduates and about 1,500 postgraduate students. Eight of the NTUA's Schools are housed at the Zografou Campus, while the School of Architecture is based at the Patission Complex.

History
NTUA was established by royal decree on December 31, 1836 (OS), January 21, 1837 (NS), under the name  "Royal School of Arts" (Βασιλικό Σχολείο των Τεχνών). It began functioning as a part-time vocational school (only Sundays and holidays) to train craftsmen, builders and master craftsmen to cover the needs of the new Greek state. In 1840, due to its increasing popularity and the changing socio-economic conditions in the new state, NTUA was upgraded to a daily technical school which worked along with the Sunday school. The courses were expanded and the institution was housed in its own building in Pireos Street.

The restructuring
In 1843 a major restructuring was made. Three departments were created:

 Part-Time Vocational School
 Daily School
 A new Higher School of Fine Arts

The new department's object was fine arts and engineering. The new department, which was later renamed School of Industrial and Fine Arts, rapidly evolved towards a major higher education institution. Tradition has it that arts referred to both technical professions and fine arts. Even today, the school maintains a school of architecture that is closely related to the School of Fine Arts, which later evolved to become a separate school.

The name Polytechnnic came in 1862, with the introduction of several new technical courses. This restructuring continued steadily until 1873. At the time, the school became overwhelmed by the plethora of students wanting to learn high technical skills, and this led to its moving to a new campus.

The relocation

In 1873 it moved to its new campus in Patission Street and was known as Metsovion Polytechnion (Metsovian Polytechnic) after the birthplace of its benefactors who financed the construction of this campus. At the time, the campus in Patission Street was even partially incomplete, but the high demand by students made it urgent to rellocate.

In 1887, the institution was partitioned into three schools of technical orientation, the schools of Structural Engineering, Architecture and Mechanical Engineering, all four-year degrees at the time. This is when the institute was recognized as a technical education facility by the state, which was a crucial step for its development, as it became accompanied to the country's needs as it developed.

In 1914, new schools were created and was officially named Ethnicon Metsovion Polytechnion (National Metsovian Polytechnic) went under the supervision of the Ministry of Public Works. This is when new technical schools started to be formed, a procedure was completed three years later, in 1917 when the NTUA changed form: By special law, the old School of Industrial Arts was now separated into the Higher Schools of Civil Engineering, Mechanical & Electrical Engineering, Chemical Engineering, Surveying Engineering and Architecture. Later, the schools of Naval Engineering, and Mining and Metallurgical Engineering were formed, and the school of Mechanical & Electrical Engineering was split up into two separate schools, Mechanical Engineering and Electrical and Computer Engineering, which is almost the form of schools maintained until now.

In 1923, the NTUA alumni formed the core of the Technical Chamber of Greece, the professional organization that serves as the official technical adviser of the Greek state and is responsible for awarding professional licenses to all practicing engineers in Greece.

In 1930, the Athens School of Fine Arts was established, acquiring its independence from the NTUA, as a school exclusively focused in the teaching the fine arts. This allowed the two schools to develop separately as a technical and an arts school respectively.

In 1941 to 1944, the National Technical University of Athens played an important role in the country's political life with the Greek students participating in the National Resistance under the German occupation. During the Axis occupation of Greece, NTUA, in addition to its function as an academic institution, became one of the most active resistance centers in Athens.

The uprising

The most important event of NTUA's history is the Athens Polytechnic uprising on November 17, 1973, which was the first step to overthrow Greece's military dictatorship.
On 14, 15 and 16 of November 1973, the students were barricaded inside the institute, and started broadcasting a pirate radio transmission, calling the people of Athens to rebel. In the evening of November 17 however, an AMX-30 class military tank broke the main gate and charged inside, after receiving orders from the dictators. About 23 people were killed in the following events and the uprising ended. The junta however, was irreparably damaged by the popular outcry. The junta fell in 1974, after the Turkish invasion in Cyprus and since then, November 17 is celebrated as a day of freedom and democracy. All schools and universities of the country remain closed on that day.

Emblem
The emblem of the National Technical University of Athens is Prometheus.

Academic profile

Schools
The National Technical University of Athens is divided into nine academic schools, which are furthermore divided into 33 departments (Greek: τομείς):

School of Applied Mathematical and Physical Sciences
School of Electrical and Computer Engineering
School of Civil Engineering
School of Mechanical Engineering
School of Architecture
School of Chemical Engineering
School of Rural and Surveying Engineering
School of Mining and Metallurgical Engineering
School of Naval Architecture and Marine Engineering
 
 School of Applied Mathematics and Physics
 Department of Mathematics
 Department of Physics
Department of Mechanics
 Department of Humanities, Social Sciences and Law
 School of Electrical and Computer Engineering
 Department of Signals, Controls and Robotics
 Department of Computer Science
 Department of Εlectric Power
 Department of Electromagnetics, Electrooptics and Electronic Materials
 Department of Industrial Electric Devices and Decision Systems
 Department of Communications, Electronics and Information Systems
 Department of Information Transmission Systems and Material Technology
 School of Civil Engineering
 Department of Structural Engineering
 Department of Water Resources, Hydraulic and Maritime Engineering
 Department of Transportation Planning and Engineering
 Department of Geotechnical Engineering
 Department of Engineering Construction and Management

 School of Mechanical Engineering
 Department of Fluid Mechanics Engineering
 Department of Thermal Engineering
 Department of Nuclear Engineering
 Department of Mechanical Constructions and Automatic Control
 Department of Manufacturing Technology
 Department of Industrial Management and Operational Research
 School of Architecture
 Department of Architectural Design
 Department of Urban and Regional Planning
 Department of Interior Design and Landscaping
 Department of Building Technology-Structural Design and Mechanical Equipment
 School of Chemical Engineering
 Department of Chemical Sciences
 Department of Process and Systems Analysis, Design and Development
 Department of Materials Science and Engineering
 Department of Synthesis and Development of Industrial Processes
 School of Rural and Surveying Engineering
 Department of Topography
 Department of Geography and Regional Planning
 Department of Infrastructure and Rural Development
 School of Mining and Metallurgical Engineering
 Department of Geological Sciences
 Department of Mining Engineering
 Department of Metallurgy and Materials Technology
 School of Naval Architecture and Marine Engineering
 Department of Ship Design & Maritime Transport
 Department of Ship Hydrodynamics
 Department of Marine Engineering
 Department of Marine Structures

Studies

Undergraduate studies
The academic calendar of NTUA comprises 10 independent, integral academic semesters. Each semester lasts 18 weeks: 13 weeks of classes, a two-week break (Christmas and Easter holidays for the fall and spring semester respectively), and three weeks of semester exams. The tenth semester is devoted to the preparation of the diploma thesis. The diploma thesis has to be related to one of the courses of the faculty. The student has at his or her disposal at least a full academic semester to prepare the thesis. Upon completion of the thesis, the student must take part in an oral examination that can take place either in June, October or February, after the final examinations, provided that the student has passed all courses prescribed by the curriculum.

An important part of the studies in NTUA are the summer "training" projects which take place in Industrial and Production Units, in the period between the end of the spring semester and the beginning of the fall semester. They constitute an elective course for the Faculties of Civil Engineering, Survey Engineering (Surveying and Geodesy Camp) and Mining and Metallurgy Engineering (Mining Camp) and are partially subsidized by the European Union.

Postgraduate studies
There are currently 20 departmental or inter-departmental postgraduate courses, coordinated by NTUA Departments, leading to the respective Post Graduate Specialization Diploma, with a minimum duration of 17 months, including one in Business Administration (in collaboration with the Athens University of Economics and Business). Moreover, NTUA participates in nine post-graduate programs coordinated by other Greek Universities. After the acquisition of the Post Graduate Specialization Diploma, the student can proceed towards submitting a doctoral thesis.

Academic staff

Academic evaluation
An external evaluation of all academic departments in Greek universities will be conducted by the Hellenic Quality Assurance and Accreditation Agency (HQAA) in the following years.

 School of Naval Architecture and Marine Engineering (2012) 
 School of Mechanical Engineering (2012) 
 School of Civil Engineering (2013) 
 School of Electrical and Computer Engineering (2013) 
 School of Mining and Metallurgical Engineering (2013) 
 School of Chemical Engineering (2013) 
 School of Applied Mathematical & Physical Science (2013) 
 School of Rural and Surveying Engineering (2014) 
 School of Architecture (2014)

Research and innovation
NTUA boasts high research activity, as research and education are both its goals. Research is managed by administrative and education personnel, but can be conducted by graduate and sometimes undergraduate students as well. Research is administrated by five different offices:
 The Special Accounting for Research Office (ΕΛΚΕ)
 The Liaison Office 
 The Innovation and Entrepreneurship Unit 
 The Internship Programme 
 The Office of Researchers
 The Interdisciplinary Research Center
 The Interdisciplinary Unit for Reusable Energy

Research is funded by the NTUA endowment, or often directly through public or private funds.

Ranking
The National Technical university of Athens is ranked 338th in the world, 116th in the European Union and third in Greece by the Webometrics Ranking of World Universities website. NTUA was ranked between 551 and 600 by the QS World University Rankings in 2012, with the corresponding faculty area ranks being 152nd for Engineering & Technology and 352nd for Natural Sciences respectively. The 2012 performance ranking of scientific papers for world universities released by the National Taiwan University (NTU Ranking) ranked NTUA as excellent. NTUA has the highest citation impact score (0.88) among the Greek universities, based on a ranking prepared by the Directorate General for Science and Research of the European Commission in 2003 (updated 2004) that was compiled as part of the Third European Report on Science & Technology Indicators.

Campus

Patission Complex

The Averof building is one of the most important and elegant buildings of the Athenian Neoclassical period located in the center of Athens and the most important work of architect Lysandros Kaftanzoglou. It constitutes also one of the most important creations of European Neoclassicism, directly influenced in its design by the monuments of the Athenian Acropolis. Its construction began in 1862 and ended in 1878. After its completion, the building was in continuous use for more than 125 years during which it suffered from several additions and alterations. The main building has housed at times the National Gallery and various exhibitions of Schliemann's archaeological findings and relics of the 1821 Greek revolution.

The Averof building reached a deteriorating state and was eventually in great need of restoration and modernization in order to continue operating as an educational establishment. The aim of the conservation project, namely for the Averof to be used again as an educational building, was successfully achieved after the building became operative in the beginning of 2010 and won the grand prize of Europa Nostra in 2012.

Zografou Campus

The main campus is located in the Zografou area of Athens, housing all the schools of NTUA except architecture, which remains in its traditional location on the Patission Avenue for historical reasons. The main campus spreads over an area of about 190 acres, 6 km from the center of Athens. It includes buildings of 65 acres with fully equipped lecture theaters, laboratories, libraries, gyms, a central library, a computer center and a medical center.

The School of Applied Mathematics and Physical Sciences is housed in the center of the campus. Right next to it is the Mining and Metallurgical Engineering School. The Civil Engineering School and the Rural and Surveying Engineering School are both housed on the south-west near the Zografou Gate. Mechanical Engineering, Chemical Engineering, Naval Engineering, and the new Electrical Engineering School are all housed near the middle of the campus, while the old electrical engineering buildings remain on the north-east.

Transportation
There are in-campus roads making all buildings accessible by bicycle and car. There are also various internal buses that allow for transportation within the facilities, driving around the perimeter of the campus and through eight different bus stops. The campus is accessible through three main gates: the Katechaki and Kokkinopoulou Gates on the north, and the Zografou Gate on the west. There are 2,000 dedicated parking spots scattered throughout the campus, most nearby all major buildings. The campus resides near the metro station of Katechaki, which makes it accessible within minutes from any area of Athens. Furthermore, six different buses are available for transportation from various city locations to the campus: the 608 from Galatsi, 230 from Acropolis, 242 from the Katechaki Metro station and 140 from Glifada.

Central Library

On the campus lies the NTUA Central Library, which has operated since 1914, and was the first library in Greece with a complete index. Today, it remains one of the largest technical libraries in the country, featuring a collection of over 215,000 books and 100,000 scientific issues. The library is available to the public at all times for studying, and available to students, faculty, and internal and external researchers for borrowing.

The central library building at Zografou campus houses also the historical library of NTUA as a special collection. This scientific-technical library is unique in Greece, and one of the most important in Europe, since it contains approximately 60,000 volumes and periodicals (1,096 titles) issued from the 17th century until 1950. The main bulk of NTUA's historical collection consists of old and rare books, pamphlets, maps, engravings and encyclopedias.

Other facilities

Lavrion Technological and Cultural Park (LTCP)
Lavrion Technological and Cultural Park (LTCP), is a body of scientific research, education, business and culture. Founded in place of the old French Mining Company of Lavrion (Compagnie Francaise des Mines du Laurium) in 1992, as a result of the initiative undertaken from the National Technical University of Athens.

LTCP aims at linking scientific and technological research conducted in Athens with the needs and interests of the business world, and to the realization of cultural events related to the promotion of the history and culture of the wider area of Lavreotiki, and the emergence of the history of activities in the past had developed in the maintenance of premises. The LTCP area is a unique monument of industrial architecture and archeology and placed him in a series of housing facilities for business and research excellence.

The services provided by LTCP as well as its renovated facilities, continue to support research, education and technology. Today, LTCP is essentially the only technology park in Attica, which specializes in areas - keys of modern applied technology, such as information technology, electronics technology, telecommunications, robotics, technology laser, environmental technology, energy, shipbuilding, marine technology, etc.

Metsovion Interdisciplinary Research Center (MIRC)

The Metsovion Interdisciplinary Research Center (MIRC) of the National Technical University of Athens for the Protection and Development of Mountainous Environment and Local European Cultures was founded in 1993 by decision of the National Technical University of Athens Senate, following the proposal of the then Rector Professor Nikos Markatos.

The principal aim of MIRC is to contribute to the protection and development of mountainous environment and local European cultures and the provision of continuing education. As well as, the conduct of research, studies, seminars and conferences, relevant to the broader object of MIRC, the creation of a European network with related organizations under the aegis of the center or the participation in already existing networks. The above will be utilized by universities, cultural, research and productive organizations with the aim of assisting Metsovon in becoming a European center of decentralized interdisciplinary, educational, research, technological and cultural activities of NTUA.

Culture

Music Department
The NTUA Music Department was established in 1960 by Chancellor Alexander Pappas. The first president of the music department was composer Vassilis Makridis. It features a mixed choir, a string orchestra, and free lessons for various instruments, among others piano, guitar, bouzouki, and cello. The music department groups regularly perform publicly within the facilities of the university, but also elsewhere. The department president today is conductor and composer Michalis Economou.

Dancing Department
The Dancing Department was established in 1990. It is formed by students, and it features various groups, including a Greek traditional and Cretan folk dances group, a European and Latin Ballroom dances group, a Salsa and a tango group. The groups meets weekly, and perform regularly inside and outside the facilities of the university. Attendance and dancing lessons are free for undergraduate and graduate students, alumni, faculty and even people not related to the university. The dancing department is housed near the center of the main campus.

Theatrical Group
The Theatrical Group was established in 1991. It is a self-managed group, which teaches the art of performance and often performs in public. Participation in the group is free for students. The theatrical group is housed near the center of the main campus. The theatrical group has also organized a separate percussion lessons group.

Sports
The main sports facilities of NTUA are housed in the Sports Center located to the south of the campus, taking up about 3,500 square meters. The campus sport facilities feature tennis and soccer courts, a field and track, a sauna, ping pong tables, and more. More than 40 sport teams exist, and the sports practiced include aerobics, yoga, Pilates, basketball, volleyball, soccer, handball, ping pong, tennis, martial arts inside the campus facilities and swimming, polo, rowing, yachting, rappelling, rafting, squash, wind surfing, and equestrianism outside.

Each year several inter-departmental championships are organized among the teams of the university faculties. NTUA student's teams have been distinguished and received many awards in Panhellenic University Games, as well as in university games abroad.

Open source
There is an open source students group whose purpose is to promote the use of open source software throughout the university and beyond. Furthermore, NTUA officially supports open source software by using it in its laboratories and other facilities, but also hosting mirrors for all major open source projects  with a collection of over 2.5 terabytes of free and open source software.

Foreign languages
English, French, German and Italian are the four languages taught in NTUA. All non-exchange students have to choose one from those as a mandatory foreign language course. For foreign students, the NTUA Linguistic Service offers the option of attending Greek courses during the entire academic year, free of charge. These courses are intended to provide students with the basic linguistic tools, so that they can understand and communicate efficiently with people in Greece.

Participation in international organizations
 CESAER – Conference of European Schools for advanced Engineering, Education and Research
 EEGECS - Network on European Education in Geodetic Engineering, Cartography and Surveying
 SEFI – Societe Europeene pour la Formation des Ingenieurs (European Society for Engineering Education)
 TIME – Top Industrial Managers Europe

Student unions
  NTUA Students' Formula Team
 Society of Naval Architects and Marine Engineers, NTUA
  Athens Local BEST Group
 Electrical Engineering STudent's European Association Local Committee of Athens (EESTEC)
 Euroavia Athens, NTUA
 International Association for the Exchange of Students for Technical Experience (IAESTE)
American Institute of Chemical Engineers Student Chapter (AIChE)

Notable alumni

 Nicholas Ambraseys - professor of engineering seismology at Imperial College London
 Dimitris Anastassiou - developer of MPEG-2 algorithm for transmitting high quality audio and video over limited bandwidth and Columbia University professor of electrical engineering
 John Argyris - one of the founders of the finite element method, professor at Imperial College London and University of Stuttgart
Costas Azariadis - professor at the Department of Economics, UCLA and Edward Mallinckrodt Distinguished University Professor in Arts & Sciences, Washington University in St. Louis
Dimitri Bertsekas - professor of engineering at MIT
Charalambos Bouras - historian, professor of History of Architecture and restoration architect
Georges Candilis - architect and urbanist, one of the founders of Team 10
 Giorgio de Chirico - painter
 Constantine Dafermos - Greek applied mathematician, professor at Brown University and recipient of Norbert Wiener Prize in Applied Mathematics
 Constantinos Daskalakis - computer scientist, professor at MIT
 Athos Dimoulas - poet
Eleftherios N. Economou -  Professor of Physics, former Chairman of the Foundation for Research and Technology - Hellas
Despo C. Fatta-Kassinos - environmental engineer, Professor at University of Cyprus
Georgios Gennimatas - former MP, minister and founding member of  Panhellenic Socialist Movement
 John Iliopoulos - recipient of the Dirac Medal
 Paris Kanellakis - computer scientist, professor at Brown University
 Linda P. B. Katehi - Chancellor of UC Davis
Alexander S. Kechris - mathematician, professor at Caltech
Emmanouil Korres - professor, writer, restoration architect
Georgios Lianis - Professor and first Minister of Research and Technology (1982)
Nikos Markatos - former Rector of the NTUA
Max Nikias - former President of the University of Southern California
 Constantine Papadakis - former president of Drexel University
 Christos Papadimitriou - computer scientist, laureate of the 2002 Knuth Prize for longstanding and seminal contributions to the foundations of computer science
 Yannis Papathanasiou - politician, former Minister for Economy and Finance of Greece
 Nicholas A. Peppas - professor in engineering, University of Texas at Austin
 Dimitris Pikionis - architect
 George Prokopiou - billionaire shipowner
 Athanasios Roussopoulos - professor in applied statics and iron constructions at the National Technical University of Athens, where his work was mostly concerned with the development of the theory of aseismic structures, politician, member of the Greek Parliament and Minister of Public Works in 1966, he was also president of the Technical Chamber of Greece
 Joseph Sifakis - computer scientist, laureate of the 2007 Turing Award for his work on model checking.
Michael Triantafyllou - professor of mechanical and ocean engineering at MIT
Alexis Tsipras - former Prime Minister of Greece
Ioannis Vardoulakis - professor of civil engineering at University of Minnesota and at NTUA, a pioneer of theoretical and experimental geomechanics
 Iannis Xenakis - one of the most important post-war avant-garde composers, pioneer of the use of mathematical models in music and architect
 Mihalis Yannakakis - computer scientist, laureate of the 2005 Knuth Prize for numerous ground-breaking contributions to theoretical computer science
 Mihail Zervos - professor of financial mathematics at London School of Economics

See also
 Athens Polytechnic uprising
 Polytechnic (Greece)
 List of universities in Greece
 Top Industrial Managers for Europe
 Open access in Greece

References

Bibliography

External links

 Hellenic Quality Assurance and Accreditation Agency (HQAA) 
 School of Naval Architecture and Marine Engineering, HQAA Final Report, 2012 
 School of Mechanical Engineering, HQAA Final Report, 2012 
 School of Civil Engineering, HQAA Final Report, 2013 
 School of Electrical and Computer Engineering, HQAA Final Report, 2013
 School of Applied Mathematical & Physical Science, HQAA Final Report, 2013
 School of Chemical Engineering, HQAA Final Report, 2013
 School of Rural & Surveying Engineering, HQAA Final Report, 2013
 School of Mining & Metallurgical Engineering, HQAA Final Report, 2013
 School of Architecture, HQAA Final Report, 2014
 NTUA Council   
 "ATHENA" Plan for Higher Education, 2013 
 National Technical University of Athens (NTUA) - official website 
 NTUA Central Library
 NTUA Network Management Center (NOC)
 NTUA DASTA Office (Career Office & Innovation Unit) 
 NTUA Internship Programme 
 NTUA Innovation and Entrepreneurship Unit (IEU)  
 NTUA ERASMUS Office
 Maps and images from NTUA's campuses.
 NTUA Publications
 NTUA Career Office
 ESN NTUA Athens
 Lavrion Technological and Cultural Park (LTCP) of NTUA
 Metsovion Interdisciplinary Research Center (MIRC) of NTUA
 NTUA Hydrological Observatory of Athens
 Greek Research & Technology Network (GRNET) 
 okeanos (GRNET's cloud service) 
 NTUA Free and Open Source Community
 IEEE NTUA Student Branch 
 Job Fair Athens 
 Hellenic Universities Rectors' Synod  
 Hellenic Universities Faculty Association 

 
Universities in Greece
Educational institutions established in 1837
Technological educational institutions in Greece
Science and technology in Greece
Education in Athens
 
Engineering universities and colleges in Greece
1837 establishments in Greece
Exarcheia
Metsovo